Mario, Maria and Mario is a 1993 Italian drama film  written and directed by Ettore Scola.

Plot 
Two young communist spouses, Mario and Maria Boschi, lead an ordinary life of work: he in the newspaper "L'Unità", she in a haberdashery, a little tense, like many, for the often urged need to reconcile the inexorable work commitments with the care and schedules of two very young children. To disturb the daily routine of the two is the crisis that arises within the local section of their party at the time of the Achille Occhetto's proposal to change name and symbol of the Italian Communist Party. Mario is for the yes, Mary for the no, and political disagreement risks to break the conjugal harmony. This risk is accentuated when in section another Mario makes an unadorned but convinced intervention in favor of the no.

Cast 
Giulio Scarpati as Mario Boschi
Valeria Cavalli as  Maria Boschi
Enrico Lo Verso as  Mario Della Rocca
Laura Betti  as Laura
Willer Bordon
 Rosa Ferraiolo 
 Bedy Moratti 
  Rocco Mortelliti

See also      
 List of Italian films of 1993

References

External links

1993 drama films
1993 films
Films directed by Ettore Scola
Italian drama films
Films with screenplays by Ettore Scola
1990s Italian films